T5 is the overall typename of trams in the fifth generation, manufactured by ČKD Tatra. This generation has brand new concept, is not based on PCC streetcar, like previous generations.

 T5A5, a prototype which shortly went in service
 T5B6, another prototype which didn't go into service.
 T5C5, 322 units produced 1978 - 1984 and sold to Budapest

Tatra trams